Tamil Nadu has a rich history of art and entertainment. The three modes of entertainment classified as Iyel (Literature), Isai (Music) and Nadagam (Drama) had their roots in the rural folk theatre like Theru Koothu (Street play). Many forms of group and individual dances with the classical forms for popularity and sheer entertainment value. Some of the dance forms are performed by Tribal people. The majority of these dances are still thriving in Tamil Nadu today.

Bamber dance
This dance is performed inside a temple, around a lamp. The purpose is to worship Lord Krishna, and celebrate his frolics with the gopikas. This is performed during Ramanavami and Gokulashtami.

Bharatanatyam  

Bharatanatyam is a major genre of Indian classical dance that originated in Tamil Nadu. Traditionally, Bharatanatyam has been a solo dance that was performed exclusively by women, and expressed South Indian religious themes and spiritual ideas, particularly of Shaivism, but also of Vaishnavism and Shaktism. Bharatanatyam may be the oldest classical dance tradition of India.

Bharatanatyam style is noted for its fixed upper torso, legs bent or knees flexed out combined with spectacular footwork, a sophisticated vocabulary of sign language based on gestures of hands, eyes and face muscles. The dance is accompanied by music and a singer, and typically her guru is present as the director and conductor of the performance and art. The dance has traditionally been a form of an interpretive narration of mythical legends and spiritual ideas from the Hindu texts. The performance repertoire of Bharatanatyam, like other classical dances, includes  (pure dance),  (solo expressive dance) and natya (group dramatic dance).

Bommalattam or puppet show
Puppet shows are held in every village during festivals and fairs. Many different kinds of puppets are used for this show - cloth, wood, leather, etc. They are manipulated through strings or wires. The puppeteers stand behind a screen and the puppets are held in front. The stories enacted in the puppet shows are from Puranas, epics and folklore. These shows are very entertaining and hold both adults and children enthralled for many hours.

Chakkai Attam

Chakkai Aattam is among the popular folk dances of Tamil Nadu. In this dance, eight to ten dancers stand in a circle or parallel lines. They hold teak wooden pieces (7 × ¾ inch in size) between their fingers, which produce the sound. The songs sung during the dance are about gods and goddesses. 

One of the folk dance forms of Tamil nadu in India is Chakkai. It is a very old form of dance practiced in the areas of Tamil Nadu. ‘Aattam’ means any kind of dance. When the word ‘Chakkai’ is added to it, a special kind of dance is understood. While performing the dance the performers stand in parallel lines while dancing. They also form a circle and perform the dance. The music, which accompanies the dance form of Chakkai Attam, is usually devotional songs, that is, songs on Gods and Goddesses.

Devaraattam

Devarattam is a pure folk dance still preserved. It was actually performed once a year near the temple. Folklore research scholars have found that Devarattam is a combination of ancient 'muntherkuruvai' and 'pintherkuruvai' of the ancient Tamil Kings. It was performed in front of and at the chariot on the victorious return of the King and his army from battle field. Sometimes even the king and his marshalls would dance on the chariot deck. The soldiers and female dancers would form in lines and dance behind the chariot.
Today, this dance does not have any songs but only danced to the beat of Urumi Melam, Thappu Melam and sometimes, a long flute. The dancers hold a kerchief in each hand and swing them as they dance. The person leading the dance wears false beard and a mask decorated with shells to look like teeth. He dances the first step, which others follow.

Kamandi or Kaman Pandigai
This is celebrated to commemorate the puranic event when Manmada the God of Love was burnt to ashes by Siva in anger. The villagers separate themselves into two parties as Erintha katchi and Eriyatha katchi and a heated debate ensues. Kaman and Rathi, his consorts, are main characters.

Kai Silambu Attam
This dance is performed in temples during Amman festivals or Navaratri festival. The dancers wear ankle-bells and hold anklets or silambu in their hands, which make noise when shaken. They perform various stepping styles jumps. The dance is in praise of all female deities, the most preferred being the powerful angry goddess - Kali or Durga.

Kazhi Attam or Kolattam
Kazhi means stick and games. This is also known as Koladi, Kolkali, Kambadi Kali and Kolaattam. Sticks one foot length are held in each hand and beaten to make a sharp, rasping sound as the dance proceeds with unique steps, twisting and turning. It is danced by both men and women, during festivals, auspicious days and weddings. The special qualities of the dance are quickness, alertness, while being careful not to hurt the other dancers by the swinging 'kol'. Earlier, the 'kols' were brightly painted and decorated with brass rings, bells etc. The dancers used to wear ankle-bells. However, no special dress or make up was used for this dance.

Karagattam

Karagattam is a Tamil folk dance involving the balancing of clay or metal pots or other objects on the dancers head. This dance is usually associated with the worship of Amman.

Kavadi

The ancient Tamils when they went on pilgrimage, carried the offerings to the gods tied on the either end of the long stick, which was balanced on the shoulders. In order to lessen the boredom of the long travel they used to sing and dance about the gods. Kavadi Aattam has its origin in this practice. Special songs were created to be sung while carrying the Kavadi Sindhu. This dance is performed only by men. It is done by balancing a pole with pots fixed on either end, filled with milk or coconut water. 
The poles are made from Purasai or Teak wood. On top, bamboo strips are bent like a half-moon, covered with saffron cloth and further decorated on the sides with peacock feathers. This is mainly a religious dance, performed in worship of Lord Murugan, the second son of Siva. The dance is accompanied by Pambai and Naiyandi Melam.

Kazhai Kothu
Kazhai Kothu is a performance of gymnastic specialised by travellers. This is very similar to modern day circus. They travel in a group from place to place, entertaining the local people and thus earning a living.

Kolattam

Kolattam is an ancient village art. It could also be called "the stick dance." This is mentioned in Kanchipuram as 'Cheivaikiyar Kolattam', which proves its antiquity. This is performed by women only, with two sticks held in each hand, beaten to make a rhythmic sound. Pinnal Kolattam is danced with ropes which the women hold in their hands, the other of which are tied to a tall pole. With planned steps, the women skip over each other, which forms intricate lace-like patterns in the ropes. As coloured ropes are used, this lace looks extremely attractive. Again, they unravel this lace reversing the dance steps. This is performed for ten days, starting with the new moon night after Deepavali.

The significance of the Pinnal Kolattam is the ups and downs of life, the mysteries of life that can be unraveled and beautiful tapestries can be woven by the sense of unity, understanding and systematic design.

Poi Kal attam
A dance performed with false legs i.e. by tying wooden sticks to the legs. Wooden sticks are covered up so that the performer will appear to look taller than usual, for viewers.

Kummi

Kummi is one of the ancient forms of village dances of Tamil Nadu. It originated when there were no musical instruments, with the participants clapping their hands to keep time. This is performed by women; many varieties of Kummi, such as, Poonthatti Kummi, Deepa Kummi, Kulavai Kummi, Kadir Kummi, Mulaipari Kummi, Kothagiri Kummi etc. are known. The women stand in a circle and dance clapping their hands rhythmically to lifting songs. The first line of the song is sung by the leading lady, which the others repeat.  This type of dance is also practiced during various religious ceremonies.

Mayil Attam

Mayil Attam is done mostly by women dressed as peacocks, resplendent with peacock feathers and a glittering head-dress complete with a beak. This beak can be opened and closed with the help of a thread tied to it, and manipulated from within the dress. 
Other similar dances are, Kaalai Attam (dressed as a bull), Karadi Attam (dressed as a bear) and Aali Aattam (dressed as a demon), which are performed in the villages during village get-togethers. Vedala Aattam is performed wearing a mask depicting demons. These dance also shows the respect of the peacocks to Lord Muruga.

Ottan Koothu
Ottas, a small group of tribals, perform this form of ritual dance on festive occasions to depict episodes from epics and other ancient stories. The women folk also participate in the dance.

The urumi is a folk instrument typically played by the Dalit community. This double-headed drum is widely believed to possess supernatural and sacred powers. When played in religious ceremonies and processions, the performance of specific beats on the urumi may induce spirit possessions or Trance. The urumi is most often performed in two types of ensembles:
- Urumi Melam
- Naiyandi Melam

Urumi melam ensembles usually consist of a melodic instrument, the double-reed Nadaswaram, a pair of double headed drums called , and one to three urumi drums. This type of ensemble is associated exclusively with funerals and other inauspicious occasions. The naiyanti melam is the most common type of folk ensemble associated with ritual and dance. A typical naiyandi melam is composed of two double-reed nadaswaram, one or two thavil (barrel drums), a tamukku (kettle drum played with leather straps), a pambai, and an urumi. It performs for a number of festive occasions including dance-dramas, menstruation ceremonies, weddings, harvest festivals, and staged folk dances such as:

- Poikkal Kudirai (dummy horse dance)
- Mayil Attam (peacock dance)
- Puli Attam (tiger dance)
- Kavadi Attam (a devotional dance to Lord Murugan)

and many others. The urumi may also be heard on commercial recordings of film soundtracks and popular folk music.

Oyilattam

Oyil means beauty. This dance is hence the dance of beauty. Traditionally, it is danced only by men. Ten years ago women also began to participate. This dance is prevalent in the south districts and Kongu Nadu in particular. First a few people will stand in a row and start dancing with rhythmic steps with musical accompaniment. Intricate steps are used in martial arts, such as Silambattam. Then gradually the row will become longer as the newcomers and guests all join and dance along as they like. The dancers wear ankle-bells. Normally, the dance is performed with the accomplishment of musical instruments and songs. It is performed near the temples or public places in the morning and evening hours, at times even till midnight. Styles of Oyilattam differ from place to place.

Oyil Kummi
No other musical instruments are used in this dance except the ankle-bells. This dance is performed by men only, during temple festivals. Stories and episodes centering on Murugan and Valli are depicted in the songs. As one of the rare folk art forms of ancient Tamil nadu, this is being practised now by the Telugu speaking people of the northern districts.

Paampu Attam

Paampu attam is the Snake dance and it is a speciality of the southern region. It arises from the popularity of the snake as a protective divinity, safeguarding the health and happiness of the rural folk.

Usually danced by young girls dressed in a tight-fitting costume designed like the snake-skin. The dancer simulates the movements of the snake, writhing and creeping, at times making quick biting movements with head and hands. The raised hands held together look like the hood of a snake.

Poikkaal Kuthirai Aattam

Poikkaal Kuthirai Aattam (False foot Horse Dance) is a folk dance form where the dancer bears the dummy figure of a horse's body on his/her hips. This is made of light-weighted materials and the cloth at the sides swings to and fro covering the legs of the dancer. The dancer dons wooden legs which sound like the hooves of the horse. The dancer brandishes either a sword or a whip. This folk dance needs much training and skill. This dance is accompanied by Naiyandi melam or Band music or Folk music. This folk dance is performed to the worship of Amman Temple Festivals, Ayyanar, Abinesh prevails Thanjavur.

Puliyattam or Puli Aattam(Tiger Dance)

Pulaiyattam is an old folk art dance of Tamilnadu state of India. A highly exuberant and cultural festival, this dance form usually comprises a troupe of 6 performers aping the movements of the majestic, predatory tigers. Their bodies are painted by the painstaking efforts of local artists in vibrant yellow and black to resemble an exact replica of a tiger. The paintings include the ferocious looking fangs and convincing headgear replete with ears paws with claws and long tail that conjures an accurate picture of the savage beast’s graceful movements.

Shattam dance 
This form of art is devoted to 'Perumal' (Maha Vishnu). In this dance the performers forming a group, with one of them acting the buffoon, dance to the music of percussion instrument like 'urumi'. The classical songs and the measured steps with graceful movements are the special features of Sevai Attam. In Sangam works this had been known as 'Pinther Kuruvai'. In those days this was performed at the rear of a chariot procession either of a king or a deity.
no image

Parai Attam
Parai Attam is a traditional dance that involves the parai, a rhythmic beat instrument. The subtle form of dance accompanied by captivating music, is an ancient rural folk art. Earlier it was used in wars too.

Koothu
Theru koothu is possibly the most popular entertainment forms in rural Tamil Nadu. It literally means "street party". These are shows that resemble musical plays and are normally conducted during village festivals, during the Tamil months of Panguni and Aadi. The show is put up at the junction of three or four streets in open air theaters/makeshift stages, and the place is lit by gas lights. A wooden bench is set up to seat the singers and the music troupe. Make-up and costumes are considered of prime importance. Traditionally, only men take part; the female roles are also played by them. The performance consists of story-telling, dialogue-rendering, singing and dancing, all performed by the artists having good performing skills. The stories are taken from Puranas (ancient texts), epics such as Ramayana and Mahabharata, and also local folklore. The play starts late in the evening and goes on until late in the night.

Theru Koothu is more popular in the northern districts of Tamil Nadu. The Koothu can be categorised as Nattu Koothu, including Vali Koothu, Kuravai Koothu etc. Samaya Koothu dealing with religious topics, Pei Koothu including Thunangai Koothu and Porkala Koothu dealing with martial events.

Urumi Attam
The whirring sound of 'urumi' providing the melody and the beat of the Thappu providing the rhythm, accompany the dance sequence in this kind of temple art form. This is performed especially in Amman temples during the month of Adi. Nowadays, this art form is found only in selected villages in a few districts.

Villu Paatu

In Villu Paatu, the main singer is accompanied by a chorus, musical instruments and a main instrument, the Villu or Bow, fixed with bells . The villu is struck rhythmically when the bells jingle in tune. The main singer relates a tale, interspersed with lively songs.  This musical tradition is exclusive to southern Tamil Nadu (Nellai to Kanyakumari) and southern Kerala.

Notes

References

See also

History of Tamil Nadu
Tamils
Tamil language
Ancient Tamil music
Carnatic music
Politics of Tamil Nadu
Indian martial arts
Araiyar Sevai

 
Tamil dance styles